Jafarabad Rural District is a rural district (dehestan) in Jafarabad District, Qom County, Qom Province, Iran. At the 2006 census, its population was 8,699, in 1,995 families.  The rural district has 36 villages.

References 

Rural Districts of Qom Province
Qom County